Viktor Borysovych Shvetsov (Ukrainian: Віктор Борисович Швецов, born 22 June 1969 in Odessa, Ukraine) is a Ukrainian professional football referee. He has been a full international for FIFA since 2008.

He served as a Fourth official at the Euro 2012.

References

External links
 Viktor Shvetsov at allplayers.in.ua

1969 births
Living people
Sportspeople from Odesa
Ukrainian football referees